The England women's cricket team toured New Zealand from 11 to 28 February 2015. The tour included five One Day Internationals. The first three matches were part of the 2014–16 ICC Women's Championship.

ODI series

1st ODI

2nd ODI

3rd ODI

4th ODI

5th ODI

T20I series

1st T20I

2nd T20I

3rd T20I

References

External links
Series home at ESPN Cricinfo

2014–16 ICC Women's Championship
Women's international cricket tours of New Zealand
2015 in English women's cricket
2015 in New Zealand cricket
New Zealand 2018
cricket
2015 in women's cricket